David Harrison may refer to:

David Harrison (artist) (born 1954), English artist
David Harrison (basketball) (born 1982), American
Sir David Harrison (chemist) (born 1930), chemist and Master of Selwyn College Cambridge (1994–2000)
David Harrison (cricketer) (born 1981), Welsh cricketer
David Harrison (footballer), English football manager active in France
David Harrison (historian), British historian of freemasonry
David Harrison (jockey) (born 1972), Welsh jockey
David Harrison (RAF officer)
David Harrison (zoologist) (1926–2015), English zoologist
David E. Harrison (1933–2019), former American politician, lobbyist and judge
David Howard Harrison (1843–1905), Premier of Manitoba, Canada
David Kent Harrison (1931–1999), American mathematician
David L. Harrison (born 1937), American children's author and poet
K. David Harrison (born 1966), Canadian-American linguist